Houston Methodist The Woodlands Hospital, located in The Woodlands, Texas (north suburban Houston), is one of seven community hospitals that are part of Houston Methodist. It employs more than 900 people, has an estimated 600 affiliated doctors and admits more than 2,800 patients annually. The hospital serves communities in and around The Woodlands.

History 
Houston Methodist The Woodlands Hospital, the newest hospital in the Houston Methodist system, opened in 2017. Houston Methodist owned land in The Woodlands for almost a quarter century before construction on The Woodlands campus began in 2014.

Hospital construction came after ExxonMobil Corp. in 2011 began building a campus near The Woodlands to house 10,000 employees

References 

Hospitals in Texas